In 2012, a number of state petitions to allow state secession were set up using the White House's petitioning system. The petitions, which had no legal standing, were set up after President Barack Obama won the 2012 presidential election. Ultimately, six petitions crossed the threshold of 25,000 e-signatures necessary to trigger a response from an Obama administration official.

The petitions prompted responses from various state governors and other elected officials, most of whom rejected the notion. In January 2013, a White House staffer officially responded to the various petitions, noting that secession was inconsistent with the United States Constitution.

Petitions and counter-petitions
In 2012, a series of online petitions were launched on the WhiteHouse.gov "We the People" electronic petitioning system, asking for secession for various states; the petition for Texas garnered the most signatures, quickly garnering the 25,000 necessary to trigger a response from an Obama administration official. The petitions were largely in response to President Obama's reelection in the 2012 presidential election.

There were eventually secession petitions set up for all fifty states, with six (Louisiana, Alabama, Florida, Tennessee, Georgia and Texas) reaching the 25,000 threshold. The Texas secession e-petition ultimately received the most e-signatures, almost 126,000.

Responses

Counter-petitions 
The petitions prompted others visitors to launch "counter-petitions, asking that the president stop states from seceding" or to deport secessionists. The petitions were started by individual citizens, not by the states themselves, and have no legal standing.

Governors 
The petitions prompted responses from several state governors who rejected the idea. A spokeswoman for Governor Robert Bentley of Alabama said "Governor Bentley believes in one nation under God" and "We can disagree on philosophy, but we should work together to make this country the best it can be." Governor Bill Haslam of Tennessee said: "I don't think that's a valid option for Tennessee...I don't think we’ll be seceding.” The press secretary to Governor Rick Perry of Texas released a statement saying Perry "believes in the greatness of our Union and nothing should be done to change it" but "also shares the frustrations many Americans have with our federal government."

Conservatives 
Conversely, a spokeswoman for Republican presidential candidate and U.S. Representative Ron Paul of Texas said that Paul "feels the same now" as he did in 2009, when he said "It’s very American to talk about secession -- that’s how we came into being."

A number of conservative media figures devoted time to discussing the petitions, such as Phil Valentine and Sean Hannity.

White House
In January 2013, the "secession petitions filed by residents of Texas, Louisiana, Alabama and five other states, as well as one counterpetition seeking the deportation of everyone who signed a secession petition," received an official response from White House Office of Public Engagement director Jon Carson. Carson rejected the secession notion, writing that open debate was positive for democracy but that the Founders had established a "perpetual union" and that the Supreme Court ruled in Texas v. White (1869) that individual states had no right to secede.

See also
Secession
Ordinance of Secession
Larry Kilgore, who changed his middle name to "SECEDE" to celebrate the petitions

References

Separatism in the United States
2012 in the United States
Petitions